André Dupont (born July 27, 1949) is a Canadian former professional ice hockey defenceman who played 13 seasons in the National Hockey League (NHL) with the New York Rangers, St. Louis Blues, Philadelphia Flyers and Quebec Nordiques. He won back-to-back Stanley Cups while a member of Philadelphia's "Broad Street Bullies" teams in the mid-1970s. He also is often referred to by his nickname, "Moose".

Playing career
As a youth, Dupont played in the 1961 Quebec International Pee-Wee Hockey Tournament with Trois-Rivières. He was drafted by the New York Rangers in the first round of the 1969 NHL Amateur Draft. He won a Memorial Cup in 1969 as a member of the Montreal Junior Canadiens. He was traded along with Jack Egers, Mike Murphy and a player to be named later to the St. Louis Blues for Gene Carr, Jim Lorentz and Wayne Connelly on November 15, 1971. He won the Stanley Cup as a member of the Flyers in 1974 and 1975. He retired in 1983.

On May 9, 1974, Dupont scored one of the most important goals in Philadelphia Flyers' history.  With 52 seconds left in Game Two of the Stanley Cup finals, he scored from the slot, beating Boston's Gilles Gilbert to level the game, 2-2.  Philadelphia won the game in overtime and seized the momentum of the series.  Ten days later, the Flyers won their first Stanley Cup.

His son, Danny Dupont, played junior hockey in the QMJHL. In 1994–95, he led the league in penalty minutes with 446 minutes, while playing for Halifax, Laval and Granby, all in one season. Danny turned to coaching and most recently was head coach of Acadie-Bathurst Titan (Bathurst NB) of the QMJHL.

Career statistics

Regular season and playoffs

References

External links
 

1949 births
Living people
Canadian ice hockey defencemen
French Quebecers
Ice hockey people from Quebec
Montreal Junior Canadiens players
National Hockey League All-Stars
National Hockey League first-round draft picks
New York Rangers draft picks
New York Rangers players
Omaha Knights (CHL) players
Ottawa Senators scouts
Philadelphia Flyers players
Providence Reds players
Quebec Nordiques players
St. Louis Blues players
Sportspeople from Trois-Rivières
Stanley Cup champions
Verdun Maple Leafs (ice hockey) players